Artyom Yuryevich Kabanov (born 20 January 1984) is a former Russian professional footballer.

Club career
He played 3 seasons in the Russian Football National League for FC Sibir Novosibirsk.

External links
 
 

1984 births
Living people
Russian footballers
Association football midfielders
FC Sibir Novosibirsk players
FC Amur Blagoveshchensk players